is a passenger railway station located in the town of Kuroshio, Hata District, Kōchi Prefecture, Japan. It is operated by the Tosa Kuroshio Railway and has the station number "TK30".

Lines and trains

The following JR Shikoku limited express services also stop at the station:

Layout
The station consists of an island platform serving two tracks with a siding. The single-storey station building has a waiting area and a cafe but the ticket window is unstaffed. Bike sheds and a limited number of parking lots are available. A level crossing leads over a track and up a ramp to the island platform

Adjacent stations

History
After the privatization of JNR, control of the station passed to Tosa Kuroshio Railway on 1 April 1988.

Passenger statistics
In fiscal 2019, the station was used by an average of 122 passengers daily.

Surrounding area
The station is located in the centre of what used to be the municipality of Saga which has now been merged into the town of Kuroshio.
 National Route 56 runs next to the station.
Shioya Beach
Saga fishing port
Kuroshio Town Saga General Branch

See also
 List of Railway Stations in Japan

References

External links

Railway stations in Kōchi Prefecture
Railway stations in Japan opened in 1963
Kuroshio, Kōchi